Revatipura may refer to:

Reotipur, Uttar Pradesh
Revathipuram, Tamil Nadu in Urapakkam